Gernot Rohr (born 28 June 1953) is a German professional football manager and former player who was most recently the manager of the Nigerian national team.

Managerial career

In 1996, he managed Girondins de Bordeaux to the UEFA Cup final, where they lost to Bayern Munich over two legs, 2–0 away and 3–1 at home. Bordeaux's run to the final included a famous 3–0 win over AC Milan in the quarter-finals. From October 1998 until April 1999 he was sports director of Eintracht Frankfurt.

Rohr was fired by Étoile Sportive du Sahel following a third-place finish in the league, outside of the 2010 CAF Champions League places, on 15 May 2009. On 9 June 2009, he was named as the new head coach of the Ligue 2 team FC Nantes, his contract running until 30 June 2011. On 3 December 2009, he was fired by FC Nantes and replaced by Jean-Marc Furlan. On 21 February 2010, Rohr replaced French coach Alain Giresse at the helm of the Gabon national football team.

He became manager of Niger national football team in September 2012. He resigned in October 2014.

On 22 December 2015, he was sacked by Burkina Faso national football team as manager.

He was shortlisted for the Guinea national team job in July 2016 but was not given the job.
In August 2016, he was named manager of the Nigeria national football team by Amaju Pinnick, the chief of the Nigeria Football Federation. He won his first game in charge of the Nigerian national team, defeating Tanzania by a lone goal in Uyo, Nigeria. He lost his first match on 10 June as Nigerian senior coach after a 2–0 home loss to South Africa.

On 7 October 2017, his Nigeria-led team became the first African side to qualify for the 2018 FIFA World Cup after a 1–0 win against Zambia. On 17 July 2019, Rohr led Nigeria to a third-place finish at the 2019 Africa Cup of Nations.
On 27 May 2020, president of the Nigeria Football Federation NFF Amaju Melvin Pinnick announced that Rohr all contractual agreement has been concluded for Rohr to extend his contract with the team

He was given a target of guiding the team to win the 2021 Africa Nation's Cup to be hosted by Cameroon.
The new contract also includes qualifying the Super Eagles to the 2022 FIFA World Cup in Qatar. On 12 December 2021, he was sacked despite qualifying for the 2021 Africa Nation's Cup and final round of qualifying for the World Cup playoffs.

Managerial statistics

References

External links

 Gernot Rohr interview (in German)

1953 births
Living people
Footballers from Mannheim
German footballers
Bundesliga players
2. Bundesliga players
FC Bayern Munich footballers
SV Waldhof Mannheim players
Kickers Offenbach players
Ligue 1 players
FC Girondins de Bordeaux players
West German expatriate footballers
West German footballers
Expatriate footballers in France
West German expatriate sportspeople in France 
German football managers
Eintracht Frankfurt non-playing staff
FC Girondins de Bordeaux managers
US Créteil-Lusitanos managers
OGC Nice managers
AC Ajaccio managers
BSC Young Boys managers
Étoile Sportive du Sahel managers
FC Nantes managers
Ligue 1 managers
2012 Africa Cup of Nations managers
Niger national football team managers
2013 Africa Cup of Nations managers
Gabon national football team managers
Association football defenders
2018 FIFA World Cup managers
Burkina Faso national football team managers
Nigeria national football team managers
German expatriate football managers
2019 Africa Cup of Nations managers
German expatriate sportspeople in France
German expatriate sportspeople in Nigeria
German expatriate sportspeople in Niger
German expatriate sportspeople in Gabon
German expatriate sportspeople in Burkina Faso
German expatriate sportspeople in Tunisia
German expatriate sportspeople in Switzerland
Expatriate football managers in France
Expatriate football managers in Switzerland
Expatriate football managers in Tunisia
Expatriate football managers in Gabon
Expatriate football managers in Niger
Expatriate football managers in Burkina Faso
Expatriate football managers in Nigeria